Valentín Nicolás Adamo Reyes (born 12 July 2002) is a Uruguayan footballer who plays as a forward for River Plate in the Uruguayan Primera División.

References

External links
Profile at Sofa Score

2002 births
Living people
Club Atlético River Plate (Montevideo) players
Uruguayan footballers
Association football forwards